The International Emmy for Best Drama is an extinct category of the International Emmy Awards. It was one of the first award categories, which highlights international drama genre of programs produced and displayed outside the United States. 

In 2002 the International Academy of Television Arts and Sciences, which conducts the awards, extinguished the category, and created a new one, the Best Drama Series.

Winners

References

External links 
International Academy of Television Arts & Sciences

International Emmy Awards
International Emmy Award for Drama winners